al-Karmil is a Palestinian village located twelve kilometers south of Hebron. The village is in the Hebron Governorate Southern West Bank, within Area A under total Palestinian control. According to the Palestinian Central Bureau of Statistics, the village had a population of 3,741 in 2007. The primary health care facilities for the village are designated by the Ministry of Health as level 2.

History
German biblical archaeologist, A. E. Mader (German article), who surveyed Palestine in 1911–1914, saw the strategic importance of historical Carmel in the fact that it's situated at the point where the main road crossing the hill country from north to south is splitting here, one road continuing towards Beersheba, and the other leading east to the southern end of the Dead Sea. The Survey of Western Palestine (SWP) authors, Conder & Kitchener, managed to trace an ancient road from Jerusalem to "El Kŭrmŭl" in 1874.

Hebrew Bible: Carmel in Judah

There are three references to al-Karmil in the Hebrew Bible. "Carmel" is mentioned as a city of Judah, the place where Saul erects a monument after the expedition against the Amalekites, and where Nabal the Carmelite resides (and ).

Late Roman and Byzantine periods
Eusebius' Onomasticon mentions a garrison stationed here at the beginning of the fourth century. Towards the end of the fourth century, already during the Byzantine period, the Notitia Dignitatum document mentions a cavalry unit in the town of Chermula. The large, perfectly preserved ancient water reservoir is noticed by all 19th-century explorers. It and a good spring provided the town with plenty of water. Although placed on three low hills and therefore hard to defend, the town was sufficiently effective as a bullwark against Bedouin raids. Mader noticed that to Eusebius it is a χώμη 'Ιουδαίων, a 'Jewish village', but the presence of at least three churches, including a large one that was part of a monastery located south of the town, all from the following two centuries, are proof that the village had strikingly become preeminently Christian during the Byzantine period. A total of three Byzantine churches were confirmed by archaeologists in recent years in the western part of ancient Carmel: a community church in the centre, and another two on hills to the north and south. Mader was witness to the villagers of Yatta using the ruins as a source for cut stones for their houses, in one case repurposing half of an inscribed lintel from a Byzantine church.

In 1984, Avraham Negev [he], starting from "still insufficient" archaeological evidence and a thorough reassessment of ancient written sources, proposed that Eusebius, by naming the village associated in his time with biblical Carmel in two different ways, Chermala and Karmelos, did not make one of his known mistakes, but reflected the existence of two associated settlements. Negev suggests that "old Carmel" (al-Karmil) was garrisoned by the Romans only after the Bar Kokhba revolt (132–135), at which point most of its Jewish inhabitants gradually left during the years 150–300. They moved away to a site little over two kilometres away, now known as Khirbet Susiya, where –according to Jerome Murphy-O'Connor, who adopted Negev's theory– they never stopped identifying as "Carmel". When Eusebius compiled his Onomasticon, the migration process had just ended. "Old Carmel"/Chermala, modern day's Khirbet al-Karmil, therefore had a successively biblical (Jewish)–Roman (pagan)–Christian history. Negev interprets two different dedicatory inscriptions from the synagogue of "new Carmel"/Karmelos/Kh. Susiya as indicating that those Jews who had remained in "old Carmel" used to come for Sabbath and holidays to pray in "new Carmel", which lay within the Sabbath limit of the old village. "New Carmel" prospered tremendously based on its trade in wine and oil with the Romans (this including the Christian Byzantine period), but after the Muslim conquest of the Levant and the withdrawal of their main customers, lost their source of income, in part due to the Muslim prohibition of consuming alcohol. The Jewish population eventually left, the name Carmel of the newer site was forgotten and eventually replaced with the Arabic Khirbet Susiya, "Ruin of the Liquorice Plant", after a common species growing there.

Crusader/Ayyubid period
"Carmel", today's Khirbat al-Karmil, was mentioned in Crusader sources in 1172/3, as the place King Amalric of Jerusalem assembled his army, next to a large ancient water reservoir. The Crusader's Carmel Castle was first mentioned in 1175 and was destroyed in 1187. In the 1920s, a Crusader tower built over the narthex of one of the Byzantine churches was seen with part of its first (upper) floor still standing, with arrow-slits on two sides; in the 1980s Pringle only found the barrel-vaulted basement with remains of the ground floor. French medievalist Paul Deschamps interpreted in the 1930s the role of the castle as built "to guard the road leading to Edom", i.e. to Oultrejordain. Emmanuel Guillaume-Rey, who visited Syria (including Palestine) between 1857–1864, saw a similarity between a type of medieval tower placed in France at strategic spots along mountain roads, and Crusader counterparts in Syria, and regarded the Carmel castle as a different variation to this theme.

Guillaume-Rey noticed the remains of a very large square structure with four round corner turrets, which he believed must have been a caravanserai, next to and therefore protected by the castle.

Le Strange quotes Yaqut al-Hamawi, who described "Kirmil" in the 1220s as "a village in the further limits of the Hebron territory, in the Province of Filastin.

19th-century explorers
Several Western explorers visiting the site in 1938 (Edward Robinson), around 1860 (E. Guillaume-Rey), 1863 (Victor Guérin) and 1874 (Conder and Kitchener) are only describing extensive ancient ruins, including the remains of at least two churches; the large (117 x 74 ft) and "fine reservoir of masonry", connected by a rock-cut tunnel to a cave spring, which in October 1874 was filled with water; and the remains of the Crusader castle.

Jordanian period
During the Jordanian era (1948-1967), the census of 1961 found 146 inhabitants in al-Karmil.

1967 and aftermath
In 1967, in a census conducted by Israel after it occupied the West Bank in the Six-day War, the village was reported to have 76 residents in 17 households.

The site contains an ancient reservoir, Birket Al-Karmel, which has been transformed into a major recreation area, with a swimming pool. Gideon Levy writes:
The terraces, decorative landscaping, Hebron stones, washrooms and a spring that gushes from the rock next to the pool – all make this one of the most spectacular outdoor sites in the West Bank.

Twice, in 2015, settler tourists under IDF guard, made incursions into the park, after the army forced the local children out of the pool and allotted them to a corner while the settlers enjoyed the pool and the site.

Footnotes

Bibliography

 (p. 403)

External links
Welcome To Khirbat al-Karmil
 Al Karmil Village (Fact Sheet), Applied Research Institute–Jerusalem, ARIJ
 Al Karmil Village Profile, ARIJ
 Al Karmil Village aerial photo, ARIJ
 The priorities and needs for development in Al Karmil village based on the community and local authorities’ assessment, ARIJ
Survey of Western Palestine, Map 21:  IAA, Wikimedia commons

Villages in the West Bank
Hebron Governorate
Municipalities of the State of Palestine